Justin Douglas may refer to
 Justin Douglas (field hockey)
 Justin Douglas (rugby)